James Bryce (24 January 1884 – 30 August 1916) was a Scottish amateur footballer who played in the Scottish League for Queen's Park as a half back.

Personal life 
Bryce attended George Heriot's School between 1898 and 1900. As of 1901, Bryce was an apprentice law clerk. Prior to the First World War, he worked for the Scottish Union and National Insurance Company. Bryce served as a private in the Royal Scots and the Cameronians (Scottish Rifles) during the First World War and was killed in West Flanders on 30 August 1916. He is commemorated on the Ploegsteert Memorial to the Missing.

Career statistics

References

Scottish footballers
Association football wing halves
Queen's Park F.C. players
Scottish Football League players
British Army personnel of World War I
British military personnel killed in World War I
Footballers from Edinburgh
1916 deaths
1884 births
Royal Scots soldiers
Cameronians soldiers
People educated at George Heriot's School